There are numerous parks throughout the city of Amsterdam, Netherlands. This is a fairly complete list of the most notable ones.

Major parks

Vondelpark
The largest and most-visited park within the city is Vondelpark. It is located near Marnixplein. It is named after Joost van den Vondel, a 17th-century Amsterdam writer.

Beatrixpark
Beatrixpark is named after Queen Beatrix.

Sarphatipark
Sarphatipark is located in the stadsdeel Amsterdam Oud-Zuid. It is named after Samuel Sarphati. Because Sarphati was Jewish, between 1942 and 1945, the park was called "Bollandpark" after G.J.P.J. Bolland.

Oosterpark
Oosterpark is located in the Oost borough. It is the first large park laid out by the municipality of Amsterdam. It is an English garden, and was designed by Dutch landscape architect Leonard Anthony Springer and was laid out in 1891.

Park Frankendael
Park Frankendael is located on the east side of Middenweg south of Oosterpark.

Rembrandtpark
Rembrandtpark park is located northwest of Vondelpark.

Westerpark
Westerpark is in the neighbourhood of Westerpark. It is situated on the former Westergasfabriek gasworks along Haarlemmerweg.

Flevopark
Flevopark is located east of Central in the Indische Buurt. It contains large lawn areas, running paths, a playground, a youth centre called Jeugdland, swimming pool, and other features.

Amsterdamse Bos
The Amsterdamse Bos is located between Amsterdam and Amstelveen. This park is around three times larger than New York City's Central Park.

Amstelpark
Amstelpark is located in the borough of Amsterdam-Zuid and is home to the Rieker windmill built in 1636.

Hortus Botanicus
Established in 1638, Hortus Botanicus is one of the oldest botanical gardens in the world. It is located in the Plantage and is a major tourist attraction.

It was originally established as a herb garden for doctors and apothecaries. It now contains more than six thousand tropical and indigenous trees and plants. The monumental Palm House dates from 1912 and is renowned for its collection of cycads.

The hexagonal pavilion dates from the late 1600s. The entrance gate was built in the early 1700s. The Orangery dates from 1875, and the Palm House and Hugo de Vries Laboratory - both created in Amsterdam School expressionist architecture - date from 1912 and 1915.

Wertheimerpark
Wertheimerpark is adjacent to Hortus Botanicus to the northeast.

Martin Luther Kingpark
Martin Luther Kingpark is located on the north bank of the Amstel River.

Sloterpark
Sloterpark is west of Central and located on the eastern shore of Sloterplas.

Frederik Hendrikplantsoen
Frederik Hendrikplantsoen is located between the neighborhoods of the Jordaan and Frederik Hendrikbuurt and is named after Frederik Hendrik, son of Prince William of Orange. In 2015 the park underwent an extensive redesign and redevelopment, including the installation of an expansive children's play area and statues by artist Joep van Lieshout, which tells the story of the history of the neighbourhood, which in the 18th and 19th centuries was the heart of Amsterdam's timber and sawmill industry.

Comprehensive list
The following is a more comprehensive list:

Amstelpark, Amsterdamse Bos, Baanakkerspark, Beatrixpark, Bijlmerweide, Darwinplantsoen, De Noorderparkkamer, Diemerpark, Eendrachtspark, Eerste Marnixplantsoen, Erasmuspark, Flevopark, Florapark, Frederiksplein, Frederik Hendrikplantsoen, Gaasperpark, Geuzenbos, Gijsbrecht van Aemstelpark, Hederabrug, Ingang Noorderpark, Martin Luther Kingpark, Amsterdam, Nelson Mandelapark, Observatorium Noord, Oeverpark, Oosterpark, Park Schinkeleilanden, Piet Wiedijkpark, Pijporgel, Rembrandtpark, Rosarium Noorderpark, Sarphatipark, Schellingwouderpark, Siegerpark, Sloterpark, Trekpontje, Treurwilg, Vliegenbos, Volewijckspark, Vondelpark, Wandelparkje, Wertheimpark, Westerpark, and Windmolenpark.

Gallery

See also

List of squares in Amsterdam
List of tourist attractions in Amsterdam

References

 
Amsterdam-related lists
Amsterdam